Leandro Chichizola (born 27 March 1990) is an Argentine footballer who plays as a goalkeeper for Italian  club Parma.

Career
Chichizola started his career with Club Sanjustino de San Justo. In 2008, he signed for River Plate, where he made his professional debut on 13 February 2011 in the first round of the Clausura 2011 tournament in a 0–0 draw against Tigre. He continued to play as River's first choice goalkeeper keeping clean sheets in all of his first four games for the club. On 13 March 2011, he conceded his first goal in a game against Vélez Sársfield after miskicking the ball straight to the opposition striker Santiago Silva

In the following game against Arsenal de Sarandí he was dropped from the first team after the usual first team goalkeeper Juan Pablo Carrizo returned to fitness.

On 29 June 2017, Chichizola signed for Spanish La Liga club UD Las Palmas. He made his debut for the club on 18 August, making several key stops in a 0–1 away loss against Valencia CF.

On 4 July 2018, Chichizola signed a three-year contract with Getafe CF. Mainly a backup option during the most of his spell, he became a third-choice ahead of the 2020–21 season, after the return of Rubén Yáñez; on 5 January 2021, he terminated his link with the club.

On 17 January 2021, Chichizola joined Segunda División side FC Cartagena on a deal until the end of the season.

On 7 July 2021, he signed with Italian Serie B club Perugia.

On 14 July 2022, Chichizola moved to Parma.

References

External links
 
 
 
  

Living people
1990 births
Sportspeople from Buenos Aires Province
Argentine footballers
Association football goalkeepers
Argentine Primera División players
Club Atlético River Plate footballers
Serie B players
Spezia Calcio players
La Liga players
UD Las Palmas players
Getafe CF footballers
FC Cartagena footballers
A.C. Perugia Calcio players
Parma Calcio 1913 players
Argentine expatriate footballers
Argentine expatriate sportspeople in Italy
Expatriate footballers in Italy
Argentine expatriate sportspeople in Spain
Expatriate footballers in Spain